The Grüntensee is a 2.5 km long and 11.2 m deep reservoir of the Wertach river with a circumference of 8.2 km in the district of Oberallgäu on the border with the district of Ostallgäu, Bavarian Swabia, Bavaria, Germany, 3.1 km west of Nesselwang. The reservoir was completed in 1962 and is used for flood protection and power generation. A hydroelectric power plant generates 1 MW of power.

The Grüntensee and some areas of its shore are also used as recreational areas. On the northern shore of the Grüntensee is the Kletterwald Grüntensee (a high ropes course).

The lake was named after the Grünten mountain on the northern edge of the Allgäu Alps, which lies about 11 kilometres to the southwest.

References 

Oberallgäu
Ostallgäu
Lakes of Bavaria